Miguel Lora Escudero (born April 12, 1961 in Montería, Córdoba), known as Miguel Lora or "Happy" Lora is a Colombian boxer. He reigned as the WBC bantamweight champion of the world from 1985 to 1988.

Beginnings and world title
Lora started training in his native Montería and eventually represented his home department.  In 1977 he won a gold medal in a local tournament. From 1980 to 1983 he won several national and regional titles.  On August 9, 1985 he got his first chance to fight for the championship against Mexican Daniel Zaragoza. Lora defeated Zaragoza  to become the fifth Colombian champion.

Memorable bouts
After the world title, Lora fought Puerto Rican Wilfredo Vázquez.  He defended his belt eight times and fought boxers such as Alberto Davila, Antonio Avelar, Ray Minus, Lucio Omar López, until he lost against Raúl "Jíbaro" Pérez.

During the three years that Miguel "Happy" Lora kept his title, he was known for his defensive, methodical style.

Retirement

After his loss to Raúl "Jíbaro" Pérez, he fought for a world title against Gaby Canizales, who won by knockout and eventually dislodged Lora's fifth cervical vertebrae. Miguel "Happy" Lora decided to retire form boxing in 1993 and since then he has been living in his native Montería, dedicated to personal business, TV shows and soap operas.

References

External links
 
 

1961 births
Living people
Colombian people of Spanish descent
Bantamweight boxers
World boxing champions
World bantamweight boxing champions
World Boxing Council champions
People from Montería
Colombian male boxers